The 2022 NHRA Arizona Nationals were a National Hot Rod Association (NHRA) drag racing event, held at Wild Horse Pass Motorsports Park in Chandler, Arizona on February 27, 2022.

Results

Top Fuel

Funny Car

Pro Stock

Notes 

NHRA Arizona Nationals

Arizona Nationals